Dobkin is a surname. Notable people with the surname include:

Alix Dobkin (1940–2021), American folk singer-songwriter
Bob Dobkin, electrical engineer
David Dobkin (director) (born 1969), film director, producer and former screenwriter
David P. Dobkin, the Dean of the Faculty and Phillip Y. Goldman '86 Professor of Computer Science at Princeton University
Debra Dobkin, musician and painter
Eliyahu Dobkin (1898–1976), leading figure of the Labor Zionism movement and signatory of the Israeli declaration of independence
Jess Dobkin (born 1970), performance artist living and working in Toronto, Canada
Lawrence Dobkin (1919–2002), American television director, actor and television screenwriter
Marjorie Housepian Dobkin (1922–2013), best-selling author and Professor in English at Barnard College, Columbia University, New York
Marlene Dobkin de Rios (1939–2012), American cultural anthropologist, medical anthropologist, and psychotherapist
Martin Dobkin, the first mayor of the City of Mississauga, Ontario
Mary Dobkin, advocate for children
Mykhailo Dobkin (born 1970), Ukrainian politician
Peter Dobkin Hall (born 1946), American author and historian
Yosef Dobkin (1909–1977), Israeli chess master